Pfeuffer is a surname. Notable people with the surname include:

 Aharon Pfeuffer (1949–1993), South African Orthodox Rabbi and Posek
 Alan J. Pfeuffer, American lawyer
 Ludwig Pfeuffer, Yehuda Amichai, (1924–2000), Israeli poet and author

See also
 Pfeiffer (surname)